This is a list of electoral results for the Nunawading Province in Victorian state elections.

Members for Nunawading Province

Election results

Elections in the 1980s

A full distribution of preferences was not carried out, as Varty recorded a majority after the fifth count.

Includes the casting vote by the returning officer.
This result was overturned by the Court of Disputed Returns and a by-election was held.

Elections in the 1970s

References

Victoria (Australia) state electoral results by district